This is a complete list of school districts of in the state of Idaho.

Ada County

Boise School District #1
Kuna Joint School District #3
West Ada School District #2

Adams County

Council School District #13
Meadows Valley Public School District #11

Bannock County

Marsh Valley Joint School District #21
Pocatello/Chubbuck School District #25

Benewah County

Plummer-Worley Joint School District #44 
Saint Maries Joint School District #41

Bingham County

Aberdeen School District #58
Blackfoot School District #55
Firth School District #59
Shelley Joint School District #60
Snake River School District #52

Blaine County
Blaine County School District #61

Boise County

Basin School District #72
Garden Valley School District #71
Horseshoe Bend School District #73

Bonner County

Lake Pend Oreille School District #84
West Bonner County School District #83

Bonneville County

Bonneville Joint School District #93
Idaho Falls School District #91
Swan Valley Elementary School District #92

Canyon County

Caldwell School District #132
Melba Joint School District #136
Middleton School District #134
Nampa School District #131
Notus School District #135
Parma School District #137
Vallivue School District #139
Wilder School District #133

Caribou County

Grace Joint School District #148
North Gem School District #149
Soda Springs Joint School District #150

Custer County

Challis Joint School District #181
Mackay Joint School District #182

Elmore County

Glenns Ferry Joint School District #192
Mountain Home School District #193
Prairie Elementary School District #191

Franklin County

Preston Joint School District #201
West Side Joint School District #202

Gooding County

Bliss Joint School District #234
Gooding Joint School District #231
Hagerman Joint School District #233
Wendell School District #232

Idaho County

Cottonwood Joint School District #242
Mountain View School District #244
Salmon River Joint School District #243

Jefferson County

Jefferson County School District #251
Ririe Joint School District #252
West Jefferson School District #253

Jerome County

Jerome Joint School District #261
Valley School District #262

Kootenai County

Coeur d'Alene School District #271
Kootenai School District #274
Lakeland Joint School District #272
Post Falls School District #273

Latah County

Genesee Joint School District #282
Kendrick Joint School District #283
Moscow School District #281
Potlatch School District #285
Troy School District #287
Whitepine Joint School District #288

Lemhi County

Salmon School District #291
South Lemhi School District #292

Lewis County

Highland Joint School District #305
Kamiah Joint School District #304
Nezperce Joint School District #302

Lincoln County

Dietrich School District #314
Richfield School District #316
Shoshone Joint School District #312

Madison County

Madison School District #321
Sugar-Salem Joint School District #322

Minidoka County
Minidoka County Joint School District #331

Nez Perce County

Culdesac Joint School District #342
Lapwai School District #341
Lewiston Independent School District #1

Owyhee County

Bruneau-Grand View Joint School District #365
Homedale Joint School District #370
Marsing Joint School District #363
Pleasant Valley School District #364

Payette County

Fruitland School District #373
New Plymouth School District #372
Payette Joint School District #371

Power County

American Falls Joint School District #381
Arbon Elementary School District #383
Rockland School District #382

Shoshone County

Avery School District #394
Kellogg Joint School District #391
Mullan School District #392
Wallace School District #393

Twin Falls County

Buhl Joint School District #412
Castleford School District #417
Filer School District #413
Hansen School District #415
Kimberly School District #414
Murtaugh Joint School District #418
Three Creek Joint Elementary School District #416
Twin Falls School District #411

Valley County

Cascade School District #422
McCall-Donnelly Joint School District #421

Washington County

Cambridge Joint School District #432
Midvale School District #433
Weiser School District #431

Single-District Counties

Bear Lake County School District #33
Boundary County School District #101
Butte County Joint School District #111
Camas County School District #121
Cassia County Joint School District #151
Clark County School District #161
Orofino Joint School District #171 (Clearwater County)
Fremont County Joint School District #215
Emmett Independent School District #221 (Gem County)
Oneida County School District #351
Teton County School District #401

See also

School districts

Idaho
School districts